Phil Mackenzie (born February 25, 1987 in Oakville, Ontario) is a retired Canadian rugby union player.

Mackenzie played for Appleby College and Oakville Crusaders in Ontario and for the University of Victoria in British Columbia.

In 2009, Mackenzie signed his first professional rugby contract with Coventry RFC. The following year Mackenzie signed on with the RFU Championship's newly promoted club, Esher RFC. Mackenzie's contract with Esher allowed him to also train with London Wasps. This gave Mackenzie the opportunity to appear regularly in the Aviva A League as part of the London Wasps' A squad.

On June 6, 2012 it was announced he had signed for London Welsh. On May 1, 2013, Phil MacKenzie left London Welsh to join Sale Sharks to stay in the Aviva Premiership for the 2013–14 season. Mackenzie debuted for Sale on 7 September 2013 in a 22–16 victory over Gloucester. Mackenzie started on the right wing, playing the full eighty minutes.

Mackenzie signed with the San Diego Breakers in early 2016 and captained the team.

After retiring from rugby, Mackenzie founded the Leansquad and began helping hundreds of people get healthier, fitter and leaner through custom meal and workout plans.

Canada
Mackenzie debuted for the Canadian national team on 1 November 2008 against Portugal. Mackenzie represented Canada at the 2011 Rugby World Cup, starting on the left wing in all four of Canada's matches and scoring two tries. Mackenzie scored the game-winning try in Canada's opening Rugby World Cup match against Tonga, and later scored another try in Canada's 23–23 draw with Japan.

References

1987 births
Canada international rugby union players
Canadian expatriate sportspeople in England
Canadian rugby union players
Living people
Sportspeople from Oakville, Ontario
Canada international rugby sevens players
Coventry R.F.C. players
Esher RFC players
London Welsh RFC players
Sale Sharks players
San Diego Breakers players